Simandoa conserfariam, also known as the Simandoa cave roach, is a species of cockroach that is currently considered extinct in the wild. However, it is kept as a pet by insect hobbyists and is therefore not considered completely extinct. Its only known habitat was one cave in the Simandou region of Guinea, where it lived in guano, however they can be recognized by their unique coloring across their head and body region.

This Cockroach once lived in a specific cave in the Simandoa region in Guinea and upon discovery, was the subject to experiments by a bunch of scientists. When the scientists returned the cave was destroyed.

References

Cockroaches
Insects described in 2004